Arthur DeWitt Ripley (January 12, 1897 – February 13, 1961) was an American film screenwriter, editor, producer and director.

Biography
In 1923, he joined the Mack Sennett studio as a comedy writer. In the 1920s, he worked closely with Frank Capra churning out screenplays for many movies. After breaking with Capra and the Sennett studio, Ripley again returned to being a gag-writer, screenwriter, and occasional director, making short films with such comedians as W. C. Fields and Edgar Kennedy. His directorial work in the 1940s, Voice in the Wind (1944) and The Chase (1946), were both critical successes, but neither film was a box office hit.

Ripley entered the world of academia, helping to establish the Film Center at U.C.L.A. while also working occasionally on TV. Ripley returned to directing one more time, at the request of Robert Mitchum, for Thunder Road (1958) before returning to U.C.L.A. and working until his death in 1961.

Selected filmography
 Alias Jimmy Valentine (1920) starring Bert Lytell
 Life's Darn Funny (1921)
 A Lady of Quality (1924)
 Hooked at the Altar (1926) short
 Heart Trouble (1928)
 Barnum Was Right (1929)
 Captain of the Guard (1930)
 Crimes Square (1931) short
 A Wrestler's Bride (1933) short
 The Pharmacist (1933) short with W. C. Fields
 The Barber Shop (1933) short with W. C. Fields
 Counsel on De Fence (1934) short
 In the Dog House (1934) short
 Shivers (1934) short
 South Seasickness (1935) short
 The Leather Necker (1935) short
 Edgar Hamlet (1935) short
 In Love at 40 (1935) short 
 Happy Tho' Married (1935) short
 Gasoloons (1936) short
 Will Power (1936) short
 How to Behave (1936) short
 How to Train a Dog (1936) short
 I Met My Love Again (1938) 
 Scrappily Married (1940) short
 Twincuplets (1940) short 
 The Last Command (1942)
 Voice in the Wind (1944)
 The Chase (1946)
 Thunder Road (1958)

References

Starman, Ray "Arthur Ripley" Films In Review magazine, March 1987, p. 164-167

External links

1897 births
1961 deaths
American film directors
American male screenwriters
20th-century American male writers
20th-century American screenwriters